Matteo Pinca (born 12 October 1990) is an Italian male rower medal winner at senior level at the World Rowing Championships and European Rowing Championships.

References

External links
 

1990 births
Living people
Italian male rowers
Rowers of Centro Sportivo Carabinieri
World Rowing Championships medalists for Italy